The 2017–18 Fairleigh Dickinson Knights men's basketball team represented Fairleigh Dickinson University during the 2017–18 NCAA Division I men's basketball season. The team was led by fifth-year head coach Greg Herenda. The Knights played their home games at the Rothman Center in Hackensack, New Jersey as members of the Northeast Conference. They finished the season 13–18, 9–9 in NEC play to finish in a tie for sixth place. They defeated Saint Francis (PA) in the quarterfinals of the NEC tournament before losing in the semifinals to LIU Brooklyn.

Previous season 
The Knights finished the 2016–17 season 11–19, 9–9 in NEC play to finish in a three-way tie for fifth place. They lost to Wagner in the opening round of the NEC tournament.

Preseason 
In a poll of league coaches at the NEC media day, the Knights were picked to finish in second place. Senior guard Darian Anderson was named the preseason All-NEC team.

Roster

 
  

 
  

  

Source

Schedule and results

|-
!colspan=9 style=| Exhibition

|-
!colspan=9 style=| Non-conference regular season  

  
|-
!colspan=9 style=| NEC regular season

|-
!colspan=9 style=| NEC tournament

References

Fairleigh Dickinson Knights men's basketball seasons
Fairleigh Dickinson
Fairleigh Dickinson
Fairleigh Dickinson